The great emo skink (Emoia maxima) is a species of lizard in the family Scincidae. It is found in Papua New Guinea and Indonesia.

References

Emoia
Reptiles described in 1953
Reptiles of Papua New Guinea
Reptiles of Indonesia
Taxa named by Walter Creighton Brown
Skinks of New Guinea